Ariel Arnaldo Ortega (born 4 March 1974) is an Argentine former professional footballer who played as an attacking midfielder. His nickname is "El Burrito" (The Little Donkey), thus he is called "Burrito Ortega".

Ariel Ortega first played for Club Atlético River Plate on 14 December 1991 and until 1996 and returned in 2000–02, 2006–08 and 2009–11. Ortega also played for Spanish club Valencia, Turkish club Fenerbahçe and Italian clubs Parma and Sampdoria. A former Argentina international, Ortega played for his country in the 1994, 1998, and 2002 World Cups. He was also a member of the team that won the silver medal at the 1996 Summer Olympics.

Club career

Beginnings in Argentina
Ortega began his professional football career in 1991 with Argentine club River Plate. With the club, he won the Primera División in 1991, 1993, 1994 and 1996, as well as the Copa Libertadores in 1996. He lost out on the 1996 Intercontinental Cup final to Juventus.

Europe
Ortega left Argentina in 1996. He played  seasons for Valencia CF before being signed by Sampdoria in 1998 for 23 billion Italian lire (£8 million), replacing Juan Sebastián Verón. After the club was relegated to Serie B, Ortega joined Parma AC, rejoining national and former club teammate Hernán Crespo, replacing Verón again who left for Lazio. Parma paid Sampdoria 28 billion lire (£9.4 million). However, in the following season he returned to Argentina with River Plate, to compensate unpaid 12 billion lire transfer fees of Crespo. (The 10% of the transfer fees to Lazio) Claudio Husaín also joined the club. River Plate acquired 50% registration rights of Ortega for a reported 5.5 million dollars. While, in Parma AC annual filing to Italian government, Ortega was sold for 11 billion lire.

Fenerbahçe and ban
In May 2002, Fenerbahçe signed Ortega from River Plate for a fee of US$7,500,000 (US$2,500,000 of which was paid to Parma). Fenerbahçe also bought his image rights for a further US$1,500,000. Ortega signed a 4-year contract. He was one of the key players of the team, scoring 5 goals in 14 matches.

Fenerbahçe were forced to file a complaint to FIFA in April 2003 as Ortega had failed to return from international duty since 12 February 2003. In June 2003 the FIFA Dispute Resolution Committee (DRC) ordered Ortega to pay Fenerbahçe USD 11,000,000 as compensation for breach of an employment contract and suspended him until 30 December 2003. Ortega appealed to the Court of Arbitration for Sport in July 2003 but the case was dismissed on 5 November. Ortega served a 4-month suspension from that day. After the ban he was without a club.

Return to Argentina
In 2004, when he could finally come back to football, he joined Newell's Old Boys after he was called by his friend Américo Gallego, who at the time was Newell's' coach. Newell paid an unknown sum to Fenerbahçe as part compensation for what Ortega owed the club. They won the Apertura 2004.

In June 2006, he went back to his first team River Plate, where he played for about half of the Apertura 2006, before he stopped to begin treatment for alcoholism. In January 2007, during River's pre-season in Mar del Plata, and one day after playing an excellent game in which he scored, he surprised everyone with another alcoholic episode, after which River Plate's doctors suggested to the coach that Ortega should go back to Buenos Aires to resume treatment for his problem.

Coach Daniel Passarella later brought Ortega back, stating he was ready for a comeback. On 15 March 2007, in a Copa Libertadores 2007 match against LDU Quito, Ortega formed part of River's bench but was not given a chance to play. However, three days later, in a league match versus Quilmes, he came on during the second half to help break the opposing team's defense in a tight 0–0 up to that point. Ortega scored a controversial goal with his hand, in the 93rd minute, to give River the victory and himself a great comeback.

Upon the arrival of Diego Simeone as head coach of River, Ortega allegedly lost some "protections" he was rumoured to have and, despite being an important part of the team that achieved the Clausura 2008 title, Simeone left him out of the squad for the upcoming season, reasoning his decision on Ortega having several times not come to train as well as some episodes of alcoholism. After some controversy and rumours in the winter window of Argentine market, he was loaned to Nacional B side Independiente Rivadavia, signing a one-year contract where a twice a week trip to a Chilean Special Treatment Center for alcoholics is one of the clauses. On 1 May 2009. he was let go by Independiente officials. The club decided to terminate his contract in advance. Ortega was on loan from River Plate.
On his first game back in River Plate, 25 July 2009, he scored an outstanding chip shot goal to give River a 1–0 victory over Everton F.C. of England in Edmonton, Canada during the preseason. In the 2009 Apertura, Ortega scored a wonder lobbed goal against Chacarita Juniors to give River Plate a 4–3 victory. Later in the tournament, he scored a last minute equalizer against Estudiantes.

In the 2010 Clausura, Ortega started River's first two matches, but suffered another alcoholic relapse and missed the next ten games before returning against Newell's Old Boys in the 13th round of matches.

In 2011, he was loaned to Defensores de Belgrano.

On 8 April 2012, Fox Sports Argentina journalist Juan José Buscalia, confirmed that Ortega would join Chilean Primera División club Unión San Felipe in June 2012.

International career
Ortega was included in the squad for the 1994 World Cup. His debut in the starting eleven occurred on 3 July 1994 when Argentina was knocked out of the competition by Romania. He also reached the final of the 1995 King Fahd Cup with Argentina, and he won a Silver Olympic medal at the 1996 Olympics in Atlanta.

Ortega was handed the #10 shirt for the 1998 FIFA World Cup, where he was expected to carry the mantle of the team's playmaker, and it was his first World Cup as an established star. Despite impressing in the early rounds to be considered a favorite as player of the tournament, Ortega was most notable for his sending-off in the quarter-finals against the Netherlands. Ortega received a second yellow card for head-butting Dutch goalkeeper Edwin van der Sar when van der Sar confronted him after a dive in the penalty area, for which Ortega was just getting his first yellow card. Shortly after Ortega's sending-off, Dennis Bergkamp scored the winning goal to make it 2–1, eliminating Argentina.

Ortega was also a member of the squad for the 2002 World Cup. Ortega missed a penalty in the last match against Sweden, which was then followed up and converted into the back of the net by Hernan Crespo, nonetheless the result meant that Argentina was knocked out in the first round.

On 24 September 2009, he was recalled to the Argentina national first-team squad, but had to miss the friendly match against Ghana due to an injury he picked up during the weekend in the Argentine Domestic League.

In April 2010, 17 years after his Argentina debut, Ortega received a call-up again, this time against Haiti. All the players in Diego Maradona's squad were from the Primera División Argentina. He played the match as starting XI on 5 May.

Style of play
A highly creative player with excellent technical ability, Ortega was well known for his pace, mobility, dribbling, and skills from dead ball situations, as well as his ball trickery, clever body feints, and lobbed shots. At his prime he was one of the best dribblers in the world; primarily deployed as an attacking midfielder, Ortega was an effective playmaker due to his vision and passing ability, which earned him comparisons with Maradona as a youth. Along with his skills, Ortega was infamously temperamental, and he was criticised throughout his career for not living up to his potential.

Career statistics

Club

International

Scores and results list Argentina's goal tally first, score column indicates score after each Ortega goal.

Honours
River Plate
Primera División: 1991 Apertura, 1993 Apertura, 1994 Apertura, 1996 Apertura, 2002 Clausura, 2008 Clausura
Copa Libertadores: 1996
Parma
Supercoppa Italiana: 1999
Newell's Old Boys
Primera División: 2004 Apertura
Argentina U-23
Pan American Games Gold Medal: 1995
Summer Olympics Silver Medal: 1996
Individual
South American Team of the Year: 1994, 1996, 2001, 2002
FIFA XI: 2001

References

External links

River Plate – Sitio Oficial 

1974 births
Living people
Sportspeople from Jujuy Province
Argentine footballers
Olympic footballers of Argentina
Footballers at the 1996 Summer Olympics
Olympic silver medalists for Argentina
Argentine Primera División players
Club Atlético River Plate footballers
Newell's Old Boys footballers
All Boys footballers
Serie A players
U.C. Sampdoria players
Parma Calcio 1913 players
La Liga players
Valencia CF players
Süper Lig players
Fenerbahçe S.K. footballers
Independiente Rivadavia footballers
Association football forwards
1994 FIFA World Cup players
1998 FIFA World Cup players
2002 FIFA World Cup players
1995 King Fahd Cup players
1995 Copa América players
1999 Copa América players
Argentina international footballers
Argentine expatriate footballers
Expatriate footballers in Italy
Argentine expatriate sportspeople in Turkey
Expatriate footballers in Spain
Argentine expatriate sportspeople in Italy
Expatriate footballers in Turkey
Argentine expatriate sportspeople in Spain
Copa Libertadores-winning players
Olympic medalists in football
Medalists at the 1996 Summer Olympics
Pan American Games gold medalists for Argentina
Pan American Games medalists in football
Footballers at the 1995 Pan American Games
Medalists at the 1995 Pan American Games